Robert Benoit (born April 11, 1944) is a Canadian politician in the province of Quebec. He served in the National Assembly of Quebec from 1989 to 2003 as a member of the Quebec Liberal Party.

Early life and career

Benoit was born in Saint-Hyacinthe, Quebec and studied commerce and administration at the Collège Paul-Valéry in Montreal. He received an investment dealer's diploma in 1968 and was hired by Dominion Securities Quebec in the same year. He became active with the Liberal Party in 1978 and campaigned for the "non" side in the 1980 Quebec referendum on sovereignty.

Benoit was president of the Quebec Liberal Party from 1985 to 1989 and led the party's finance committee for at least part of this time. At the party's 1987 conference, he called for Liberals to shift from a purely economic focus and devote more attention to social issues, creating policies to benefit the homeless and unemployed. The following year, Benoit helped persuade the party's youth wing to endorse the Canada-United States Free Trade Agreement. He also supported the unsuccessful Meech Lake Accord on reforming the Canadian constitution.

For twenty-three years, Benoit was the next-door neighbour of Canadian author Mordechai Richler.

Legislator

Benoit was chosen as the Liberal candidate for Orford in the 1989 provincial election, despite objections from some local organizers who regarded him as a candidate of the party establishment. He was easily elected. The Liberals won a second consecutive majority government, and Benoit entered legislature as a backbench supporter of Robert Bourassa's government. He was appointed as parliamentary assistant to the premier on November 29, 1989, and served in this position until December 14, 1993.

Benoit campaigned in Quebec's Eastern Townships in support of the Charlottetown Accord on Canadian constitutional reform in 1992. The accord was defeated in a referendum. In April 1993, Benoit said he would support a liberalization of Quebec's Charter of the French Language, which restricts the public use of languages other than French. He was re-elected in the 1994 election as the Liberals lost government to the Parti Québécois. After the election, he served as his party's critic for the environment and industry.

In 1995, Benoit supported Progressive Conservative candidate Guy Lever in a federal by-election in Brome—Missisquoi. Lever finished a distant third against Denis Paradis of the Liberal Party of Canada. Benoit later became one of the first Quebec Liberal MNAs to encourage federal Progressive Conservative leader Jean Charest to seek the Quebec Liberal leadership in 1998. Charest was eventually chosen as leader without opposition.

Benoit was elected to a third term in the 1998 provincial election. The Parti Québécois were re-elected provincially, and Benoit once again served as his party's critic for the environment. In 2002, he negotiated with Parti Québécois minister André Boisclair to secure the amalgamation of Magog, Quebec with neighbouring communities. He did not seek re-election in 2003, standing aside for star candidate Pierre Reid.

Out of the legislature

After leaving the legislature, Benoit taught history at the college level and tutored in the Université de Sherbrooke's Master of Business Administration program.

Benoit strongly opposed the Charest government's decision to sell part of the Mont-Orford National Park to private developers in 2006. He helped form the group SOS Parc Mont-Orford to lobby against the sale and tried to overturn the decision via an emergency resolution within the Liberal Party.

He called for fundamental changes to the Liberal Party in 2010, saying that it had become simply "a machine for collecting money."

Electoral record

External links

References

1944 births
Living people
Quebec Liberal Party MNAs
People from Saint-Hyacinthe
21st-century Canadian politicians